JetFighter II: Advanced Tactical Fighter is a 1990 video game published by Velocity Development.

Gameplay
JetFighter II: Advanced Tactical Fighter is a game in which the F23-D Advanced Tactical Fighter (ATF) equipped with stealth technology is added to three other jets from the original game: the F-14 Tomcat, the F/A-18 Hornet and the F-16 Falcon.

Reception
Jim Hoover reviewed the game for Computer Gaming World, and stated that "In summary, for those who do not have the privilege of attending the U.S. Navy's flight school in Pensacola, Florida, this will probably be the closest they will ever get to landing on a carrier in a high-performance jet. Jetfighter II: Advanced Tactical Fighter does a great job of simulating both the difficulty and exhilaration a pilot experiences once he finally places his jet on the carrier deck and comes to a screeching halt after catching the 'three wire.'"

David Upchurch for ACE (Advanced Computer Entertainment) rated the game 935 and said "Ideal for green rookie or grizzled veteran. Now recruits can instantly practice flight, taking off or landing in conditions as simple or as complex as required, while the varied missions would keep even the infamous Baron Richthofen busy for a couple of months. If you don't fancy tackling the Adventure, you can practice any of the 125 (count 'em - I did) missions."

Julian Boardman for Raze rated the game 85% and said "There is nothing in the gameplay to make it stand out from other flight sims, it is neither better nor worse than any other. However, the graphics really do warrant a viewing. After all, if you're going to get a flight simulation, you may as well get one with great graphics."

A 1992 survey in Computer Gaming World of wargames with modern settings gave the game three and a half stars out of five.

Reviews
ASM (Aktueller Software Markt) - Jun, 1991

See also
Falcon 4.0

References

1990 video games
Combat flight simulators
DOS games
DOS-only games
Video games developed in the United States
Video games set in the United States